"Miracle Worker" is the debut single by rock supergroup SuperHeavy from their self-titled debut studio album. It is a reggae/pop song performed by Damian Marley, Joss Stone, and Mick Jagger. It was released on 7 July 2011 as a digital download in the United Kingdom. The song peaked to number 136 on the UK Singles Chart but it was a big hit in Japan peaking at number 9.
In Italy it was certified gold for downloads exceeding 15,000 units.

Music video
A music video to accompany the release of "Miracle Worker" was uploaded to YouTube on 12 August 2011 at a total length of five minutes and eight seconds. It was directed by Paul Boyd and filmed at Paramount Studios in Los Angeles, the video features all five members of the band.

Track listing

Charts and certifications

Weekly charts

Certifications

Release history

References

2011 debut singles
Songs with music by A. R. Rahman
Songs written by Mick Jagger
Songs written by Joss Stone
SuperHeavy songs
Songs written by David A. Stewart
2011 songs
Music videos directed by Paul Boyd